Charles Trumbull Hayden (April 4, 1825February 5, 1900) was an American businessman and probate judge.  His influence was felt in the development of Arizona Territory where he helped found both the city of Tempe and Arizona State University.  Hayden is also known as the father of U.S. Senator Carl Hayden.

Life and career
Hayden was born on April 4, 1825 in the village of Haydens in Windsor, Hartford County, Connecticut, the son of Joseph and Mary Hanks Hayden.  He was a descendant of English settlers who arrived in 1630 and settled in the Connecticut River valley.  Hayden's father died when he was six, leaving himself and his sister Anna to help his mother run the family farm.  He completed his education at 16 and worked as a clerk for several years before leaving home in 1843.  His departure was motivated in part by a lung ailment.

From Connecticut, Hayden went to New York City, where he studied law, before beginning a series of teaching jobs in Kentucky, Indiana, and Missouri.  While in Kentucky, Hayden was influenced by Henry Clay's vision of opening the West to settlement by the development of roads and canals.  By 1847, he was working as a teamster hauling freight on the Santa Fe Trail.

Following ratification of the Gadsden Purchase, Hayden established a store in Tubac which served the nearby mines.  By 1860, he had moved to Tucson and according to census records had assets worth US$20,000.  In addition to working as a merchant, Hayden also worked as a freighter and civic leader.  With the creation of Arizona Territory, he added mail contractor to his list of duties.  Finally, he was appointed a probate judge by Governor Goodwin and he achieved the title "judge".

Hayden remained in Tucson until 1873 when he moved to the Salt River valley.  Local legend claims that while he was on a business trip from Tucson to Prescott, flood waters on the Salt River delayed him near the present location of Tempe, Arizona for several days.  Using this time to explore the site, Hayden saw the potential to develop a new town at the site.  In December 1870, Hayden published a notice claiming two sections along the south side of the Salt River "for milling, farming, and other purposes".  He used the land to build a cable ferry, grist mill, general store, and other related businesses.

On October 4, 1876, at the age of 51, Hayden married Arkansas-born schoolteacher Sallie Calvert Davis in Nevada City, California.  The couple would have four children, Carl Trumbull, Sallie Davis, Anna Spenser, and Mary "Mapes" Calvert.  Anna died when two-and-a-half years old while the three other children reached maturity.
 
Politically, Hayden made an unsuccessful run to be Arizona Territory's Congressional Delegate in 1874.  This was followed in 1884 when Grover Cleveland considered him for Governor of Arizona Territory.  In 1885, Hayden succeeded in having a former employee, John S. Armstrong, elected to the 13th Arizona Territorial Legislature.  Believing the territory's need lie primarily in educating new teachers, Hayden used his connection with Armstrong to lobby for the Territorial Normal School.  Hayden even favored the normal school over the fiscally more lucrative insane asylum, arguing "Stockton, California was known to most people only as the place where insane people are confined" and that Tempe should not risk gaining a similar reputation.  The normal school established in Tempe is now Arizona State University.

Hayden remained in Tempe for the rest of his life and died on February 5, 1900. He is buried in Tempe's Double Butte Cemetery. Mount Hayden in the Grand Canyon is named after him.

Hayden's House and Mill

Notes

References

External links

Charles Trumbull Hayden by Tempe Historical Society
Hayden's historic home in Tempe, listed on the Tempe Historic Property Register

1825 births
1900 deaths
American people of English descent
Arizona pioneers
Arizona Territory judges
Politicians from Tempe, Arizona
Probate court judges in the United States
19th-century American businesspeople
People from Hartford, Connecticut
19th-century American judges